Football (Kaduregel) is the most popular sport in Israel. Football as an organised sport, first developed in the United Kingdom, who controlled Mandatory Palestine during the days of the British Mandate.

The Israel Football Association joined the Asian Football Confederation in 1954, but was expelled in 1974 due to political pressure from Arab and Muslim members in the context of the Arab–Israeli conflict. In the late 1970s and 1980s, the Israel Football Association was not affiliated with any confederation. During this period, the Israeli national teams were only playing in FIFA competitions occasionally in OFC, UEFA and CONMEBOL qualifying tournaments. Finally, it was admitted to UEFA as an associate member in 1992 and as a full member in 1994, therefore their teams compete as part of Europe in all international competitions.

Israel Football Association
The Israel Football Association (IFA) is the governing body of football in the State of Israel. All of Israel's professional football clubs must be members, and hundreds of semi-professional and amateur clubs also belong.

League system

As of the 19-20 season, the Israeli football league system has five levels and 16 different divisions, all run by the IFA. Promotion and relegation operate between each level,  allowing clubs to progress from bottom to top within four seasons.

Structure
The current structure of the Israeli league system is this:
 Israeli Premier League: the top division operates at the national level and has 14 member clubs
 Liga Leumit: the second division operates at the national level and has 16 member clubs
 Liga Alef: the third division is split into two regional leagues (north and south) and has 32 member clubs (16 in each division)
 Liga Bet: the fourth division is split into four regional leagues (two in the north, two in the south) and has 64 member clubs (16 in each division)
 Liga Gimel: the fifth division is split into eight regional leagues and has 114 member clubs (between 11 and 16 in each division)

Cups
In Israel, there are two major cup competitions: the State Cup and the Toto Cup.

State Cup
The State Cup (Gvia HaMedina) is the Israeli equivalent of the English FA Cup, and is open to all Israeli clubs, with clubs at the higher levels entering in the later rounds. It is a straightforward knock-out cup. The winner qualifies for the UEFA Europa Conference League.

Toto Cup 
The Toto Cup (Gvia HaToto) is the Israeli equivalent of the English League Cup, the main difference being that there is a separate cup for the top and second divisions. The cup is played first in a group stage, with the highest placed teams qualifying for the knock-out stages. The winner does not qualify for the UEFA Europa Conference League.

Title Holders

Qualification for European competitions
Clubs who do well in either the Premier League or State Cup qualify to compete in various UEFA-organised Europe-wide competitions in the following season (as well as continuing to play in domestic competitions). The number of Israeli clubs playing in Europe in any one season can range from four to six, depending on the qualification scenarios. Currently, Israel is awarded the following places in European competitions:

In addition, once in a European competition, it becomes possible to qualify for others:

 All the losers of the UEFA Champions League Preliminary Round and First qualifying round go forward to the UEFA Europa League Second qualifying round
 All the losers of the UEFA Champions League Second qualifying round go forward to the UEFA Europa League Third qualifying round
 All the losers of the UEFA Champions League Third qualifying round go forward to the UEFA Europa League Play-off round
 All the losers of the UEFA Champions League Play-off round go forward to the UEFA Europa League Group stage.
 Any clubs playing in the UEFA Champions League that will finish third in the group stage will go into the UEFA Europa League round of 32

Israel national team

Israel hosted and won the 1964 AFC Asian Cup. Israel qualified for the World Cup in 1970 which was held in Mexico. Mordechai Spiegler scored in a 1–1 draw against Sweden. Israel's Olympic football team qualified for the 1968 Summer Olympics and the 1976 Summer Olympics both times reaching the quarter finals.

Israel's highest FIFA ranking was 15th in November 2008.

Famous matches of the Israeli football team include the 1-2 and 0-1 defeat against Iran respectively in 1968 AFC Asian Cup and 1974 Asian Games, both held in Tehran when Israel and Iran were on friendly terms, the 3–2 win in France in the 1994 World Cup qualification, which ended up disqualifying the French team from the World Cup in the United States, the defeat of Austria 5–0 in 1999 during Euro 2000 qualifications, and a 2–1 win over Argentina in a friendly match in 1998, a game played in Teddy Stadium in Jerusalem.

History

British Mandate
During the British Mandate for Palestine, organised football consisted mainly of British and Jewish clubs, although Arab clubs also existed and took part in IFA competitions. As early as 1906, Maccabi Tel Aviv was formed as a social club, followed by a string of Maccabi clubs in other cities and towns, such as Jerusalem, Petah Tikva, Haifa, Zikhron Ya'akov and Hadera. On 24 April 1924, Hapoel Haifa was formed. Shortly after formation, they joined the World Maccabi Organization. The first membership cards read "Club Hapoel Sport, Cultural Organization Haifa" (A member of the World Maccabi Organization). Later, during a meeting of Hapoel labourers in Afula, it was decided to break off from the World Maccabi Organization and create the Hapoel (Labor) Organization, followed by Hapoel teams from Tel Aviv, Jerusalem, Herzliya and other cities and towns. Later, during the 1930s and the 1940s other sport organisations were formed, such as Beitar (founded by the right-wing revisionist party), Elitzur (formed by the religious Hapoel HaMizrachi party) and the short lived Hakoah 09 (formed by former members of Hakoah Vienna).

In February 1928, the first ever Tel Aviv derby took place. Maccabi won 3–0 and thus the oldest rivalry in Israel was born.

During the 1920s, and before the IFA was established, two cup competitions were held, one which acted as an unofficial national cup, which was dominated by British military teams, and one named Magen Shimshon, which was open to Maccabi clubs. In 1928 the People's Cup began. This cup would later be known as Palestine Cup and, after the Israeli Declaration of Independence, the Israel State Cup. In the first final, played in Tel Aviv two Jewish clubs, Hapoel Tel Aviv met Maccabi Hasmonean Jerusalem and won by a score of 2–0, but the cup was shared since Maccabi appealed to the newly formed IFA that Hapoel had fielded an ineligible player.

Nine teams started the first league in 1932. The first winner of the league was the British Police, who, under the guidance of Police Chief Speiser, were the best-organised club in the country; Speiser would later serve as the first chairman of the football association. The league was held inconsistently, and only 10 titles were won between 1932 and 1947, all of which, beside the first title, were one by either Maccabi Tel Aviv (4 titles) or Hapoel Tel Aviv (5 titles).

During the British Mandate period, the IFA representative team competed under the title of Eretz Israel/Palestine, operating as a virtually all-Jewish combination. The first international match was a qualifying match for the 1934 World Cup against Egypt in Cairo, which resulted in a 7–1 defeat. The second leg played in Tel Aviv, resulted in a 4–1 defeat and an 11–2 aggregate loss. Earlier, in 1931, a mixed team of Palestinians, Jews, and British police played an international match in Egypt.

During this period Jewish teams took international tours in order to promote both football in Mandatory Palestine and the Zionist cause. Such tours include Maccabi Haifa tour of the United States in 1927, Maccabi Eretz Israel tour of Australia in 1939 and Hapoel Tel Aviv tour of the US in 1947. In return, many internationally famed clubs visited Mandatory Palestine and played Jewish and British clubs. Among these clubs are Hakoah Vienna, MTK Budapest and Hajduk Split.

Post independence
Just four months after Israel gained independence, the Israeli national team travelled to New York City to play their American counterparts in a friendly at the Polo Grounds. Over 40,000 spectators witnessed the newly formed Israeli side lose to the Americans 3–1. Shmuel Ben Dror went down in history as the first goal scorer in the history of the Israeli national team.

In 1967, Hapoel Tel Aviv became the first club to win the Asian Club Championships. In the 2001–02 UEFA Cup Hapoel reached the quarter-finals after knocking out Chelsea, Lokomotiv Moscow and Parma.

The 1970s  and early 1980 were dominated by Maccabi Tel Aviv, Hapoel Tel Aviv and Maccabi Netanya. During the mid-1980s under the guidance of coach Shlomo Scharf Maccabi Haifa F.C. rose to power, winning its first two championship titles. In 1992, when Israel rejoined UEFA, Maccabi Haifa was bought by businessman Ya'akov Shahar who lead European standards of high quality management in the Israeli club. This move paved the way for private ownerships of football clubs in Israel.

Successful Israeli players who also played outside Israel include Eli Ohana, Mordechai Spiegler, Giora Spiegel, Ronny Rosenthal, Avi Cohen, Eyal Berkovich, Haim Revivo, Dudu Aouate, Yossi Benayoun, Tal Ben Haim, Elyaniv Barda and Biram Kayal.

The 2000s (decade) was dominated by Maccabi Haifa F.C. who won seven out of 11 possible championship titles, and also recorded good results in European tournaments such as the UEFA Champions League and UEFA Cup.

Israeli teams have also qualified for the UEFA Champions League group stage six times: Maccabi Haifa in the 2002–03, 2009–10 and 2022-23 seasons; Maccabi Tel Aviv in the 2004–05 and 2015-16 seasons; and Hapoel Tel Aviv in the 2010–11 season.

After 2018, when Willi Ruttensteiner was appointed as technical director of the national team, a national football academy was founded, and three supporting development centers were established. As well the training of the coaches was strengthened.

See also
List of football stadiums in Israel
Women's football in Israel

References

External links
Israel Football Association
RSSSF website
(Un)Bounded Soccer: Globalization and Localization of the Game in Israel